Ras-related protein Rab-21 is a protein that in humans is encoded by the RAB21 gene.

References

Further reading